Crime Scene is a docuseries directed by Joe Berlinger and aired on Netflix. There are currently three seasons.

Crime Scene: The Vanishing at the Cecil Hotel
Crime Scene: The Times Square Killer
Crime Scene: The Texas Killing Fields

Television series created by Joe Berlinger